Fuling Catholic Church is a Roman Catholic church located in Fuling District of the city of Chongqing, West China. In the West, it's best known for the description given by Peter Hessler in his book River Town: Two Years on the Yangtze (2001).

History
The church was founded in 1861 by French missionaries. The church also had two French priests until the Communist Revolution; According to written sources, the church was converted into a sock factory by the Red Guards during the Cultural Revolution. The priest and the neighborhood, instead, assert that the church itself was just closed down and the sock factory was started in the buildings in front of the church.

In 1981 the church reopened and on the first Sunday less than twenty nervous people went to Mass. The church was renovated in 1991, as stated on the plaque next to the entrance of the church.

The neighborhood
Fuling Catholic Church is located in Fuling historical city center. This area will be heavily renewed in 2017. Many buildings, except the very old ones, will be torn down. After consultation with the government, it has been agreed that the church will not be torn down and rebuilt in Lidu (李渡镇) neighborhood.

Gallery

See also 
 Catholic Church in Sichuan

References

Bibliography
Books

 

Roman Catholic churches in Chongqing